Stoya is an American pornographic actress, actress, model, and writer.

Early life
Stoya was born to a Scottish father and a Serbian mother. As a child, she wanted to become a dancer, and started dance lessons at the age of three. She was home-schooled and received her high-school diploma before the age of sixteen. Because her father worked in IT, Stoya had access to electronics and gaming equipment, through which she developed her love of technology. "I was three when I was using DOS. My mom taught me how to read, and my dad taught me how to navigate DOS."

After moving to Philadelphia, she attended a summer program at UArts. Some of her jobs in Philadelphia included being a secretary, flier distributor, and a go-go dancer. Stoya appeared in several music videos for bands that, according to her, "no one will ever hear of." In May 2009, Stoya said that she would be moving from Philadelphia and relocating to Los Angeles in the fall of that year.

Career
Stoya began posing for adult pictures for a friend, which eventually led her to modelling and working for alt-erotic websites. She chose her stage name based on a shortened version of her grandmother's Serbian maiden name and trademarked the name in 2009.

Stoya was featured in two DVD productions for Razordolls, and she made a non-sex, cameo appearance in two Vivid Alt titles before being contacted by Digital Playground with a proposition to perform in a hardcore lesbian scene with Sophia Santi. The scene in question never happened, but, in August 2007, she met with several Digital Playground representatives and was asked if she would star in a pornographic movie with male talent. After careful consideration, Stoya agreed.

In October 2007, Digital Playground signed her to an exclusive, three-year contract. Stoya is regarded as the company's first alt porn contract girl. The first scene that she shot for them was for Stoya Video Nasty (promoted on the DVD box as the first film featuring her engaging in heterosexual intercourse), but her first movie released by the company was Jack's POV 9.

In 2009, Stoya appeared in her first mainstream crossover project as Kamikazi Shegun 5000 in the award-winning 48 Hour Film Project "The Kingpin of Pain".

Even though Stoya was under exclusive contract with Digital Playground, Evil Angel director John Stagliano received "special permission" in 2013 to cast her in the sequel for the adult film series Voracious. As of 2014, she left Digital Playground and is now focusing her career on directing. She financed and directed her first film in February 2014. On March 4, 2014, Stoya and Kayden Kross created the pay-per-scene pornographic website TRENCHCOATx. In addition to running the site, Stoya performed in and also directed some of the films.

Stoya appears as a main cast member in the 2016 mainstream lesbian fantasy series Dagger Kiss.

In February 2018, Stoya starred in the Serbian sci-fi film A.I. Rising (also known as Ederlezi Rising) in the role of the android, Nimani, on a space mission with a cosmonaut played by Slovenian actor Sebastian Cavazza. The two become romantically entwined when the cosmonaut starts to believe there might be something human inside his android companion.

In 2018, Stoya launched the website zerospaces.com with her business partner, comedian Mitcz Marzoni. Zerospaces describes itself as a "sexually explicit media project" with videos, photosets and articles pertaining to sex and sexuality. Though Stoya indicated in February 2020 that the platform would move to a monthly release schedule in April of that year, by July, only one 2020 issue of Zerospaces had been released.

Acting
In 2012, Stoya appeared in Amanda Palmer's music video for "Do It with a Rockstar". She has acted in two of Dean Haspiel Off Broadway plays: Harakiri Kane (Die! Die, Again!) and The Last Bar at the End of the World.

Writings
Stoya writes regular columns for Slate,
Vice and The Verge, along with a sex-advice column for Refinery29. She has published pieces in The New York Times, New Statesman, Esquire, The Guardian, Nylon, Playboy, and XCritic, as well as an article in Porn Studies, a peer-reviewed academic journal. She published her first book in 2018, entitled Philosophy, Pussycats, and Porn, a collection of personal and critical essays.

Beginning with her June 29, 2021 Slate "How to Do It" column — which she had previously written as Stoya — she began using "Jessica Stoya" as her byline.

Personal life
Stoya has acknowledged the importance of social networking in her career; she is active on MySpace, Twitter, Tumblr, and various Internet forums.

In June 2009, she was reported to be dating Marilyn Manson, but they later broke up due to Manson's touring schedule. Afterwards, she dated pornographic actor James Deen for several years. On November 29, 2015, Stoya wrote on Twitter that James Deen coercively penetrated her without consent: Deen denied the allegations, calling them "false," "egregious," and "defamatory." Following Stoya's statement, eight other women went public with assault allegations against Deen. San Francisco-based Internet pornography studio Kink dropped Deen, and the website The Frisky terminated his column.

Awards
 2008 Eroticline Award – Best U.S. Newcomer
 2009 AVN Award – Best New Starlet
 2009 AVN Award – Best All-Girl Group Sex Scene – Cheerleaders
 2009 XBIZ Award – New Starlet of the Year
 2009 XRCO Award – New Starlet
 2012 AVN Award – Hottest Sex Scene (Fan Award) – Babysitters 2
 2014 XBIZ Award – Best Scene – Feature Movie – Code of Honor
 2018 FEST Beograd – Best Actress "Ederlezi Rising"
 2019 XBIZ Award – Best Actress – All-Girl Release Talk Derby to Me

References

External links

 Official blog
 
 
 
 "From Barbie Doll to Razordoll: The Sexual Shift in Porn" by Lauren Mayberry, The Skinny, July 30, 2009.
 
 Podcast Interview at Adult DVD Talk
 Stoya interview (05:12) re "A.I. Rising"; (1:21)

21st-century American actresses
Alt porn
American bloggers
21st-century American writers
American female adult models
American pornographic film actresses
American people of Scottish descent
American people of Serbian descent
Living people
Actors from Wilmington, North Carolina
Pornographic film actors from North Carolina
American women bloggers
21st-century American women writers
Year of birth missing (living people)